Nataliya Yuryevna Podolskaya (born 14 October 1993) is a Russian sprint canoeist.

Podolskaya represented Russia at the 2012 Summer Olympics in London, where she competed only in the women's K-4 500 metres, along her teammates Yuliana Salakhova, Vera Sobetova, and Yulia Kachalova. Podolskaya and her team finished seventh in the final by six thousandths of a second (0.006) behind the Portuguese team (led by Teresa Portela), with a time of 1:33.459. In June 2015, she competed in the inaugural European Games, for Russia in canoe sprint, more specifically, Women's K-1 200m. She earned a silver medal.
She qualified for the women's K-1 200 metres and women's K-1 500 metres events at the 2020 Summer Olympics.

References

External links

1993 births
Russian female canoeists
Living people
Olympic canoeists of Russia
Canoeists at the 2012 Summer Olympics
Canoeists at the 2020 Summer Olympics
Canoeists at the 2010 Summer Youth Olympics
People from Vologda
European Games medalists in canoeing
Canoeists at the 2015 European Games
European Games silver medalists for Russia
Canoeists at the 2019 European Games
ICF Canoe Sprint World Championships medalists in kayak
Sportspeople from Vologda